Del Rio International Airport  is two miles northwest of Del Rio, in Val Verde County, Texas, United States. It is used for general aviation, and, being near Laughlin Air Force Base, it is often used by USAF students.

Facilities
The airport covers 268 acres (108 ha) at an elevation of 1,002 feet (305 m). Its single runway, 13/31, is 6,300 by 100 feet (1,920 x 30 m) asphalt. In 2010 the airport had 15,357 aircraft operations, an average of 42 per day: 83% general aviation, 9% airline, and 8% air taxi. 42 aircraft were then based at the airport: 79% single-engine, 12% multi-engine, and 9% helicopter. Federal Aviation Administration records say the airport had 16,028 passenger boardings (enplanements) in calendar year 2008, 13,436 in 2009, and 13,180 in 2010. The National Plan of Integrated Airport Systems for 2011–2015 categorized it as a primary commercial service airport (more than 10,000 enplanements per year).

The airport is owned by the City of Del Rio. A seven-member airport advisory board, appointed by the City Council, monitors the development and operations of the airport. The terminal has counter space to accommodate two airlines, but is currently only served by twice-daily American Airlines service operated by regional partner SkyWest Airlines on their 65-seat Canadair CRJ 700 aircraft. The Texas Department of Public Safety (DPS) Air Patrol Unit has a station at the airport. The city is working on a 2,500 feet expansion of the runway, when completed will have a total of 8,800 feet. The runway expansion is due to Laughlin AFB future arrivals of the new Boeing T-7A Red Hawks training jets which will also utilize the airport for training.

FedEx has a shipping center on the north boundary of the airport. They serve Del Rio with four Cessna 208 Caravans with daily service to San Antonio. Ameriflight operates Beechcraft 1900 with daily service to San Antonio International Airport on behalf of United Parcel Service. Major air cargo companies provide weekly service between Del Rio and Detroit, Michigan for automotive part manufacturers in Ciudad Acuña and Piedras Negras, Mexico. The following jets are utilized for the Del Rio route: Ameristar (DC-9), USA Jet (MD-83 and DC-9), IFL Group Cargo (Boeing 727-200), and Kalitta Air (Boeing 737-300 and DC-9).

Airlines and destinations

Passenger

Cargo service

Former service

For four or five years starting in 1949 Trans-Texas Airways Douglas DC-3s flew from Del Rio to El Paso, Houston, San Antonio, and other Texas cities, but they used Val Verde County Airport east of town. That airport  closed in 1959–60. The first airline at the present airport was Wild Goose Airlines in 1964, on their flights between Eagle Pass and San Antonio. Davies/Quastler says they flew Aztecs.

Between May and November 2017 Texas Sky Airlines, operated by Contour Aviation, scheduled a daily British Aerospace Jetstream between Del Rio International Airport and Dallas/Fort Worth International Airport.

From June 7, 2012, until April 2013 ExpressJet (United Express) Embraer ERJ-145s served Del Rio, flying nonstop to Houston Intercontinental Airport. The route previously used turboprops. Continental Connection had served Del Rio before the merger of Continental Airlines with United Airlines. The Continental Connection service nonstop to Houston Intercontinental was flown by Colgan Air Saab 340s.

Other commuter airlines at Del Rio included Lone Star Airlines (which also operated as Aspen Mountain Air), Texas National Airlines, Alamo Commuter Airlines, Amistad Airlines, and Wise Airlines.

References

External links
 Airport page at City of Del Rio website
 Pico Aviation, the fixed-base operator (FBO)
 Aerial image as of February 2002 from USGS The National Map
 

Airports in Texas
Buildings and structures in Val Verde County, Texas
Transportation in Val Verde County, Texas
1937 establishments in Texas
Airfields of the United States Army Air Forces in Texas
USAAF Contract Flying School Airfields
Airports established in 1937